Augustin-Norbert Morin (October 13, 1803 – July 27, 1865) was a Canadien lawyer and judge.

Born in Saint-Michel-de-Bellechasse, Lower Canada, into a large Roman Catholic farming family, Morin was identified by the parish priest at a young age as a boy of exceptional talent and intelligence. The parish priest therefore arranged for his education at the Séminaire de Québec, beginning in 1815.  After leaving the seminary, Morin worked as newspaperman in order to earn money for the study of law as clerk in the office of Denis-Benjamin Viger. By 1828 he was practicing law independently, and by 1830 had become involved with colonial politics.

In 1834 Morin was elected to the 15th Parliament of Lower Canada. Morin helped draft the Ninety-Two Resolutions. Although he took part in the Lower Canada Rebellion and was later arrested, it was not felt that a charge of high treason was justified.

Following the union of Lower Canada and Upper Canada into the new Province of Canada in 1841, Morin was elected to the first Parliament of the new Province, for the Nicolet electoral district.  He resigned his seat a year later on appointment to the district court for Rimouski, but served on the bench for less than a year.  He resigned from the court and was re-elected to Parliament, this time for the riding of Saguenay, in November, 1842.

Morin served as Joint Premier of the Province of Canada from Canada East along with his counterparts from Canada West Francis Hincks (from October 28, 1851, to September 11, 1854), and with Allan Napier MacNab (from that date until January 27, 1855).

He resigned from government due to ill health. However, Morin was named a judge in the Quebec Superior Court and he also took part in the commission which drafted a new civil code for Canada East.

Morin-Heights, Quebec, and Val-Morin, Quebec, which Morin help found, are named for him. He also helped found Sainte-Adèle, Quebec, which was named after his wife Adèle Raymond, the sister of Joseph-Sabin Raymond.

He died at Sainte-Adèle in 1865.

See also 
List of presidents of the Saint-Jean-Baptiste Society of Montreal

External links
 

1803 births
1865 deaths
Premiers of the Province of Canada
Members of the Legislative Assembly of Lower Canada
Members of the Legislative Assembly of the Province of Canada from Canada East
Presidents of the Saint-Jean-Baptiste Society of Montreal
Persons of National Historic Significance (Canada)
Province of Canada judges